James Henry Kenneth Oliver (10 August 1924 – 13 May 1994) was an English professional footballer who played as a defender for Sunderland.

References

1924 births
1994 deaths
Sportspeople from Loughborough
Footballers from Leicestershire
English footballers
Association football defenders
Brush Sports F.C. players
Sunderland A.F.C. players
Derby County F.C. players
Exeter City F.C. players
English Football League players
Royal Marines personnel of World War II
Military personnel from Leicestershire